James Gandolfini (1961–2013) was an American actor who has received multiple awards and nominations for his television and film work. Gandolfini started acting in small budget films throughout the 1980s and early 1990s. In 1995, he played Bear, a stuntman and gangster, in the crime thriller-comedy film Get Shorty. Gandolfini, along with the rest of the cast, received a Screen Actors Guild Award for Outstanding Performance by a Cast in a Motion Picture nomination, at the 2nd Screen Actors Guild Awards. In 1997, Gandolfini was cast as Tony Soprano, a crime boss and family man, in the HBO crime drama series The Sopranos (1999-2007). Gandolfini received critical acclaim for the role, receiving three Emmy Awards, three Screen Actors Guild Awards, and a Golden Globe Award. Many television critics have named Gandolfini's performance as Soprano as one of the greatest and most influential in television history. While on The Sopranos, Gandolfini continued to appear in films. In 2001, he played gay hitman Winston Baldry in the adventure comedy film The Mexican. He won the Best Performance by an Actor in a Supporting Role award at that year's Outfest Awards. Gandolfini also appeared in Broadway shows. In 2009, for his role as Michael in God of Carnage, he was nominated for the Best Actor in a Play at the 63rd Tony Awards. 

Gandolfini died in 2013 while on a vacation in Italy. Romantic comedy-drama film Enough Said (2013) and crime film The Drop (2014) were released after his death. He received positive reviews for his role in the former, receiving multiple film critics awards and nominations. In addition to acting, he co-produced multiple documentaries with HBO. He received a Primetime Emmy Award for Outstanding Limited Series nomination for the 2012 biopic Hemingway & Gellhorn. The 2016 crime drama miniseries The Night Of, in which Gandolfini was a co-executive producer, received multiple awards and nominations for directing, producing, and technical achievements.

Awards and nominations

Notes

References

External links 
 List of awards and nominations at IMDb

Gandolfini, James